Jessica Nigri (born 1989) is an American-New Zealand cosplayer, promotional and glamour model, YouTuber, voice actress, and fan convention interview correspondent. She has been cosplaying since 2009 and modeling since 2012, having served as an official spokesmodel for several video games and comic book series, including Lollipop Chainsaw and Assassin's Creed IV: Black Flag. She is also notable for her voice work as Cinder Fall in RWBY.

Early life
Nigri was born in Reno, Nevada, United States and grew up in Christchurch, New Zealand, which is her mother's homeland. She later moved to Arizona. Nigri has been cosplaying since 2009, when her cosplay of "Sexy Pikachu" that she wore to San Diego Comic-Con International went viral on the Internet. In 2011, she promoted Gears of War 3 for Microsoft and GameStop, dressed up as the game's character Anya Stroud for the game's release.

Career
In 2012, Nigri won IGN's contest for a model to portray Juliet Starling, protagonist of Suda51's video game Lollipop Chainsaw and was hired as a spokesmodel by Warner Bros. Games. When she appeared as Juliet at the 2012 Penny Arcade Expo (PAX) East, convention officials, having received complaints that the pink outfit she was wearing was too revealing, asked her to either change or step off the floor and restrict her presence; Nigri changed into Juliet Starling's regular costume, but it was deemed too revealing as well and she was asked to leave. As part of the deal, Kadokawa Games brought her on Lollipop Chainsaw to Japan to attend Akihabara and tour Japanese video game magazines and websites, including Famitsu and Dengeki. That same year, Nigri signed up to promote or represent several other works, including Kill3rCombo's video game Elsword and comic book series Grimm Fairy Tales (for Zenescope Entertainment) and Knightingail (by Crucidel Productions).

Nigri was hired to be a spokesmodel for Amazing Arizona Comic Con 2011, was invited to multiple conventions including Anime Expo 2012, Anime Revolution 2012 (including appearing as the convention mascot Senkaku Mei) and 2013, AVCon 2013, Montreal Comiccon 2013, Anime South 2013 and Ottawa Pop Expo, as a guest of honor. She was featured on YouTube channels and shows such as KassemG and The Philip DeFranco Show and in a unique card in the downloadable trading card game Z.

In 2013, Nigri was again approached by Suda51 to portray the character Vivienne Squall from Grasshopper Manufacture's new video game Killer Is Dead, to which she accepted. That same year, after cosplaying the character Connor Kenway from Assassin's Creed III, she was hired by Ubisoft to portray a female version of Captain Edward Kenway, the protagonist of video game Assassin's Creed IV: Black Flag at Gamescom 2013. At E3 2013, she portrayed both Vivienne Squall and Edward Kenway; she also represented Tecmo Koei's video game Yaiba: Ninja Gaiden Z, portraying the character Miss Monday at PAX 2013. In 2014, she cosplayed at Carbine Studios' WildStar PAX East booth.

Nigri has worked as an interviewer for media outlets such as GameZone, RUGGED TV and Comic Book Therapy. She also starred in several commercial video advertisements and music videos and did charity work. Aside from appearing on the PDS in the past, Nigri is a friend of DeFranco, including having her merchandise hosted in his store ForHumanPeoples, Nigri opened her own online poster store, named Nigri please! According to PlayStation Official Magazine, Nigri is "not just a cosplayer but also a massive gamer"; she says she has played video games since her early childhood, starting at an age of seven and having been first exposed to them by her father.

Nigri has been active as a member of the cosplay group XX Girls and Kat Gunn's professional gaming and cosplay team, Less Than 3 (LT3), sponsored by Mad Catz. Nigri has also worked with theCHIVE. For some time, a particular interest of Nigri has been to dress up as "genderbending" female versions of various male characters.  After Nigri reportedly declined to appear on the controversial 2013 reality show Heroes of Cosplay, the Syfy network's producers manufactured what appeared to be a fierce rivalry and dislike between her and the show's star Yaya Han in order to make the series look more dramatic; the two later appeared together to explain they are actually friends in real life and the show is not necessarily an accurate representation of cosplay subculture. Nigri said she plans to eventually retire from modeling and to study and pursue a career in the "behind the scenes" aspects of marketing and advertising.

Filmography

Film and television

Commercials

Music videos

Video games

References

External links

 

21st-century American actresses
21st-century New Zealand actresses
Actresses from Phoenix, Arizona
Actresses from Reno, Nevada
American bloggers
American female models
American people of New Zealand descent
American video game actresses
American voice actresses
American women bloggers
American YouTubers
Cosplayers
Living people
New Zealand bloggers
New Zealand women bloggers
New Zealand female models
New Zealand people of American descent
New Zealand video game actresses
New Zealand voice actresses
New Zealand YouTubers
OnlyFans creators
People from Christchurch
Video bloggers
Women video bloggers
1989 births